The 7th Women's World Chess Championship took place during the 1939 Olympiad in Buenos Aires. The final results were as follows:

{| class="wikitable"
! !! Player !! 1 !! 2 !! 3 !! 4 !! 5 !! 6 !! 7 !! 8 !! 9 !! 10 !! 11 !! 12 !! 13 !! 14 !! 15 !! 16 !! 17 !! 18 !! 19 !! 20 !! Points
|- style="background:#ccffcc;"
| style="background:gold;"|1 ||  || - || 1 || 1 || 1 || 1 || ½ || 1 || 1 || ½ || 1 || 1 || 1 || 1 || 1 || 1 || 1 || 1 || 1 || 1 || 1 || 18
|-
| style="background:silver;"|2 ||  Sonja Graf (stateless) || 0 || - || 0 || 1 || 0 || 1 || 1 || 1 || 1 || 1 || 1 || 1 || 1 || 1 || 1 || 1 || 1 || 1 || 1 || 1 || 16
|-
| style="background:#cc9966;"|3 ||  || 0 || 1 || - || 0 || 1 || 1 || 1 || 1 || 1 || 1 || 1 || 0 || 1 || ½ || 1 || 1 || 1 || 1 || 1 || 1 || 15½
|-
| 4 ||  || 0 || 0 || 1 || - || 1 || ½ || 1 || 1 || 1 || 1 || 1 || ½ || 1 || 1 || 1 || 1 || 0 || 1 || 1 || 1 || 15
|-
| 5 ||  || 0 || 1 || 0 || 0 || - || 1 || 1 || ½ || 1 || ½ || 1 || 1 || 1 || 1 || 0 || 1 || 1 || 1 || 1 || 1 || 14
|-
| 6 ||  || ½ || 0 || 0 || ½ || 0 || - || 1 || ½ || ½ || 1 || ½ || 1 || ½ || 1 || 1 || 1 || ½ || 1 || 1 || ½ || 12
|-
| 7 ||  || 0 || 0 || 0 || 0 || 0 || 0 || - || 1 || ½ || 0 || 1 || 1 || 1 || 1 || 1 || ½ || 1 || 1 || 1 || 1 || 11
|-
| 8 ||  || 0 || 0 || 0 || 0 || ½ || ½ || 0 || - || ½ || 1 || ½ || 1 || 1 || ½ || 1 || ½ || 1 || 1 || 1 || 1 || 11
|-
| 9 ||  || ½ || 0 || 0 || 0 || 0 || ½ || ½ || ½ || - || ½ || ½ || 1 || ½ || ½ || ½ || ½ || 0 || 1 || 1 || 1 || 9
|-
| 10 ||  || 0 || 0 || 0 || 0 || ½ || 0 || 1 || 0 || ½ || - || ½ || 1 || 1 || 1 || ½ || 0 || 1 || 1 || 0 || 1 || 9
|-
| 11 ||  || 0 || 0 || 0 || 0 || 0 || ½ || 0 || ½ || ½ || ½ || - || ½ || 1 || 1 || 1 || 0 || 0 || 1 || 1 || 1 || 8½
|-
| 12 ||  || 0 || 0 || 1 || ½ || 0 || 0 || 0 || 0 || 0 || 0 || ½ || - || ½ || 1 || ½ || ½ || ½ || 1 || 1 || 1 || 8
|-
| 13 ||  || 0 || 0 || 0 || 0 || 0 || ½ || 0 || 0 || ½ || 0 || 0 || ½ || - || ½ || ½ || 1 || 1 || 1 || 1 || 1 || 7½
|-
| 14 ||  || 0 || 0 || ½ || 0 || 0 || 0 || 0 || ½ || ½ || 0 || 0 || 0 || ½ || - || 1 || 1 || 1 || 0 || 1 || 1 || 7
|-
| 15 ||  || 0 || 0 || 0 || 0 || 1 || 0 || 0 || 0 || ½ || ½ || 0 || ½ || ½ || 0 || - || 1 || ½ || 1 || ½ || 1 || 7
|-
| 16 ||  || 0 || 0 || 0 || 0 || 0 || 0 || ½ || ½ || ½ || 1 || 1 || ½ || 0 || 0 || 0 || - || 1 || 1 || ½ || ½ || 7
|-
| 17 ||  || 0 || 0 || 0 || 1 || 0 || ½ || 0 || 0 || 1 || 0 || 1 || ½ || 0 || 0 || ½ || 0 || - || 0 || ½ || 1 || 6
|-
| 18 ||  || 0 || 0 || 0 || 0 || 0 || 0 || 0 || 0 || 0 || 0 || 0 || 0 || 0 || 1 || 0 || 0 || 1 || - || ½ || 1 || 3½
|-
| 19 ||  || 0 || 0 || 0 || 0 || 0 || 0 || 0 || 0 || 0 || 1 || 0 || 0 || 0 || 0 || ½ || ½ || ½ || ½ || - || 0 || 3
|-
| 20 ||  || 0 || 0 || 0 || 0 || 0 || ½ || 0 || 0 || 0 || 0 || 0 || 0 || 0 || 0 || 0 || ½ || 0 || 0 || 1 || - || 2
|}

As a result of her outspoken defiance of Hitler's government, Sonja Graf was taken off the list of German participants and played in the women's tournament under the flag of the fictitious country "Libre" ("free" in Spanish).

Graf and Paulette Schwartzmann, along with many of the male players, chose to stay in South America, as World War II broke out during the tournament.

Due to the outbreak of war, there was no Women's World Chess Championship for the next ten years. Meanwhile, Menchik died in England in 1944 in a German air raid, so the next championship in 1949–50 had to determine a new champion.

References 

Women's World Chess Championships
1939 in chess
Chess in Argentina
1939 in Argentine sport
Sports competitions in Buenos Aires
International chess competitions hosted by Argentina